Kenneth Dokken (born 10 October 1978) is a Norwegian football coach and former football midfielder. Dokken is currently the assistant coach of Eliteserien club Vålerenga. He is the son of former Norway international striker Arne Dokken, who is currently the assistant manager of Danish club AGF.

He is best known for a violent off-the-ball tackle on Johan Arneng.

Kenneth Dokken was head coach of IF Birkebeineren. He was head coach at Notodden from 2012 to 2019.

Career statistics 
Source:

References

1978 births
Living people
Norwegian footballers
Strømsgodset Toppfotball players
Hønefoss BK players
Hamarkameratene players
Odds BK players
Ranheim Fotball players
Sandefjord Fotball players
Eliteserien players
Norwegian First Division players
Norwegian football managers
Notodden FK managers
People from Lørenskog
Association football midfielders
Sportspeople from Viken (county)